The following is a list of 2017 box office number-one films in Japan. When the number-one film in gross is not the same as the number-one film in admissions, both are listed.

Highest-grossing films

See also
List of Japanese films of 2017

References

2017
Japan
2017 in Japanese cinema